Kuhestan Rural District is a rural district (dehestan) in Jazmurian District, Rudbar-e Jonubi County, Kerman Province, Iran. At the 2006 census, its population was 4,435, in 960 families. The rural district has 68 villages.

References 

Rural Districts of Kerman Province
Rudbar-e Jonubi County